University of Arad may refer to one of two institutions in Arad, Romania:

Aurel Vlaicu University of Arad (public)
Vasile Goldiș Western University of Arad (private)